Isbister Holm is a small islet in the Shetland islands of Scotland, situated roughly  east off the coast of Isbister, Whalsay. To the north are the islets of Mooa and Nista. On 12 November 1778 Jufron Ingester was shipwrecked, probably on the holm, the precise location not being certain. It was carrying some 260 tons of skins, tallow and coarse hose from Ireland to Copenhagen. One crew member died and the cargo was not salvaged.

References

Islets of Whalsay
Uninhabited islands of Shetland